Abma or ABMA may refer to:

Organizations
All Burma Monks' Alliance
American Bearing Manufacturers Association
Army Ballistic Missile Agency

People with the surname
Harmen Abma (1937-2007), Frisian abstract artist
Karin Abma (born 1951), Dutch rower
Mark Abma, Canadian freeskier

Other uses
Abma language, a language of Vanuatu